Colonel Stafford Vere Hotchkin  (1876 – 8 August 1953) was an English landowner, soldier, High Sheriff of Rutland and briefly a Conservative Member of Parliament.

He was the only son of Thomas John Stafford Hotchkin of The Manor House, Woodhall Spa by Mary Charlotte Edith Lucas, elder daughter of George Vere Braithwaite of Edith Weston Hall. He was educated at Shrewsbury School.

He married Dorothy Arnold in 1906. Their issue included Neil Hotchkin (1914–2004).

He served in the 21st Lancers and Leicestershire Yeomanry, but throughout the First World War he served with the  Royal Horse Artillery in Palestine.  He was awarded the Military Cross in the 1918 Birthday Honours.

Hotchkin developed an interest in golf course architecture and he set up his own golf course design company, Ferigna, in the late 1920s. He had provided the land for Woodhall Spa Golf Club and later redesigned the course.  He also designed a number of links courses in South Africa.

He narrowly won the by-election for Horncastle for  the Liberal-Conservative Coalition on 25 February 1920 but lost the seat in the 1922 General Election to the Liberal Samuel Pattinson.

References

External links
 SV Hotchkin: golf’s military mind Golf Course Architecture

1876 births
1953 deaths
UK MPs 1918–1922
Members of the Parliament of the United Kingdom for English constituencies
High Sheriffs of Rutland
People from Woodhall Spa
Royal Artillery officers
British Army personnel of World War I
Recipients of the Military Cross
English landowners
People educated at Shrewsbury School
21st Lancers officers
Leicestershire Yeomanry officers
Deputy Lieutenants of Lincolnshire